Novovozdvizhenka (Yañı Vozdvijenka) is a rural locality (a village) in Vozdvizhensky Selsoviet, Alsheyevsky District, Bashkortostan, Russia. The population was 9 as of 2010. There is 1 street.

Geography 
Novovozdvizhenka is located 41 km southwest of Rayevsky (the district's administrative centre) by road. Chelnokovka is the nearest rural locality.

References 

Rural localities in Alsheyevsky District